Multa (Mıy Tuu) is a rural locality (a selo) in Verkh-Uymonskoye Rural Settlement of Ust-Koksinsky District, the Altai Republic, Russia. The population was 704 as of 2016. There are 10 streets.

Geography 
Multa is located on the right bank of the Katun River, 33 km southeast of Ust-Koksa (the district's administrative centre) by road. Zamulta is the nearest rural locality.

References

External links
 7 unique and isolated Russian villages. Russia Beyond. 

Rural localities in Ust-Koksinsky District